Kodjo Afanou (born 21 November 1977) is a French former professional footballer who played as a defender.

Club career
Born in Tabligbo, Togo, Afanou moved to France at a young age. He started his career at Girondins de Bordeaux. He made 194 appearances for the club in 10 Ligue 1 seasons, 21 appearances in UEFA Cup and 10 appearances in UEFA Champions League. In his time at Bordeaux he won Ligue 1 in the 1998–99 season and the 2001–02 Coupe de la Ligue. He left the club in February 2006. He was without a club for a year, before joining Gaziantepspor in January 2007. Afanou was released in January 2008, before joining for Al-Hazm in Saudi Arabia.

International career
Afanou was capped for France at U-20 level, playing 1997 FIFA World Youth Championship.

References

External links

Profile at Turkish Football Federation

1977 births
Living people
People from Maritime Region
French footballers
France under-21 international footballers
French expatriate footballers
FC Girondins de Bordeaux players
Al Ain FC players
Ligue 1 players
Süper Lig players
Association football defenders
Gaziantepspor footballers
Togolese emigrants to France
Expatriate footballers in Turkey
Togolese expatriate sportspeople in Turkey
France youth international footballers
Al-Faisaly FC players
Al-Hazem F.C. players
Saudi Professional League players